Marilyn Eastman (December 17, 1933 – August 22, 2021) was an American actress.

Early years
Eastman was born in Beaver, Iowa, on December 17, 1933, but lived in Pittsburgh, Pennsylvania, later.

Biography 
Eastman started her career in radio before joining her husband, Karl Hardman, at the production company The Latent Image, Inc. She played the character Helen Cooper in the horror classic Night of the Living Dead in 1968. She also assisted in the film's screenwriting and make-up.

Eastman died on August 22, 2021, at the age of 87.

Filmography 
Perry Mason (1960)
Night of the Living Dead (1968)
Houseguest (1995)
Santa Claws (1996)

References

External links 

1933 births
2021 deaths
People from Iowa
American film actresses
20th-century American actresses
21st-century American actresses